Richard Roat (July 3, 1933 – August 5, 2022) was an American actor.

Early years 
Roat was born on July 3, 1933, in Hartford, Connecticut. He was the son of Mr. and Mrs. Richard D. Roat, and he graduated from Trinity College. He pursued acting as a career despite a lack of encouragement from his dramatic coach at Trinity.

Career 
Before he achieved professional status, Roat performed with amateur theatrical groups around Hartford, including the Mark Twain Masquers and Oval in the Grove. He also directed the premiere production of the Tunxis Players. During those years he worked for Aetna Fire and drove a delivery truck for the Newton Robertson Bakery.

In 1957, Roat hitchhiked to New York City to seek work as an actor there. There he studied with Uta Hagen and Herbert Berghof and supported himself with jobs that included working in a gift shop and hanging wallpaper. On January 1, 1961, he replaced Michael Ebert in The Wall at Broadway's Billy Rose Theater. His other Broadway credits included Sunday in New York (1961) and Come on Strong (1962). He also performed for a season in summer stock theater in the Adirondack Mountains.

On television, Roat starred on the daytime drama The Doctors in addition to appearing on Car 54, Where Are You?, Naked City, and other programs.

In addition to his performing, Roat prepared taxes for entertainers for more than 50 years.

Personal life and death 
Roat died of a heart attack on August 5, 2022, in Newport Beach, California. At the time of his death, he was married to Kathy Arntzen.

Partial filmography

Film
March (2001)
California Myth (1999)
Heart and Souls (1993)
Murder by Numbers (1990)
House Made of Dawn (1987)
American Hot Wax (1978)
Westworld (1973)
Babo 73 (1964)

Television
Cold Case (2006)
Medical Investigation (2004)
Rock Me Baby (2004)
Friends (2000)
Family Law (1999)
Seinfeld (1996)
Melrose Place (1993)
Who's the Boss? (1991)
ALF (1987)
The Golden Girls (1986)
Dynasty (1986)
Cheers (1985)
Hill Street Blues (1982-1985)
Kojak (1978)
Columbo (1971)
The Fugitive (1965)
Car 54, Where Are You? (1962)

References

External links

1933 births
2022 deaths
American male film actors
American male television actors
20th-century American male actors
21st-century American male actors
Broadway theatre people
Actors from Hartford, Connecticut